Sir John Beckett, 2nd Baronet, FRS (17 May 1775 – 31 May 1847) was a British lawyer and Tory politician.

Beckett was the son of Sir John Beckett, 1st Baronet (1743–1826), and his wife Mary, daughter of Christopher Wilson (bishop), Bishop of Bristol. He was also a descendant of Edmund Gibson, Bishop of London.

He was elected to Parliament for Cockermouth in 1818, a seat he held until 1821, and then sat for Haslemere from 1826 to 1832 and for Leeds from 1835 to 1837.

Beckett was admitted to the Privy Council in 1817 and appointed Judge Advocate General by Prime Minister Lord Liverpool in the same year. He held this office until 1827, and again under the Duke of Wellington from 1828 to 1830 and under Sir Robert Peel from 1834 to 1835.

Beckett married Lady Anne Lowther, daughter of William Lowther, 1st Earl of Lonsdale, in 1817.

He died in Brighton on 31 May 1847, aged 72, and is buried at All Saints Church, Fulham, London.

He was succeeded in the baronetcy by his younger brother, Thomas Beckett. Beckett's nephew (and the 5th baronet) was the architect Edmund Beckett, 1st Baron Grimthorpe.

References

External links 
 

1775 births
1847 deaths
Conservative Party (UK) MPs for English constituencies
Baronets in the Baronetage of the United Kingdom
UK MPs 1818–1820
UK MPs 1820–1826
UK MPs 1826–1830
UK MPs 1830–1831
UK MPs 1835–1837
Members of the Privy Council of the United Kingdom
Fellows of the Royal Society
Tory MPs (pre-1834)
Burials at All Saints Church, Fulham
John